Tarakçı can refer to the following villages in Turkey:

 Tarakçı, Bolu
 Tarakçı, Cide